Anne Leinonen (born 1973 in Juva) is a Finnish science fiction and fantasy writer who has received the Atorox Award and was a co-nominee for the 2012 Tähtivaeltaja Award.

Anne Leinonen studied geography at Helsinki University. She has written short stories and novels for young adults. Many of her works are co-authored with Eija Lappalainen. Leinonen has graduated with a Master of Philosophy from the University of Helsinki, majoring in geography. Leinonen works as a publisher and educational material producer in Mikkeli.

References 

Finnish children's writers
Finnish fantasy writers
Finnish science fiction writers
Finnish women short story writers
Finnish short story writers
Finnish women children's writers
1973 births
Living people
Women science fiction and fantasy writers